Jordon Zadorozny (born c.1974 Pembroke, Ontario) is a Canadian rock musician and producer. He is the singer and songwriter for indie rock band Blinker the Star. He is best known for cowriting songs with Courtney Love in the late 1990s. Zadorozny has also appeared on recordings by Melissa Auf der Maur, Sam Roberts, Tara Slone and Mandy Moore. He produced a number of bands in the Ontario area at his Skylark Park studios. Jordon was a member of Canadian indie band Abbey with Sofia Silva from 2004 to 2008. He has since reformed Blinker the Star and released the album We Draw Lines and his latest, 8 Of Hearts.

See also

 Music of Canada
 Canadian rock
 List of Canadian musicians

References

External links
 SheLoom

1974 births
Living people
People from Pembroke, Ontario
Canadian songwriters
Canadian rock singers
Canadian indie rock musicians
Musicians from Ontario
21st-century Canadian male singers